Telicota colon, commonly known as the pale palm dart or common palm dart, is a butterfly belonging to the family Hesperiidae found in India to Australia.

Description

The larvae are known to feed on Bambusa vulgaris, Phragmites karka, Oryza, Saccharum and Ochlandra travancorica.

Subspecies
Telicota colon colon
Telicota colon argeus (Plötz, 1883) – pale darter (south-eastern coast of New South Wales, the northern Gulf and northern coast of the Northern Territory, the northern Gulf and north-eastern coast of Queensland and the north-western coast of Western Australia, Irian Jaya, Maluku and Papua New Guinea)
Telicota colon vaja Corbet, 1942 (Philippines to Sumatra and to Timor)
Telicota colon vega Evans, 1949 (Papua New Guinea)
Telicota colon stinga (Malacca)
Telicota colon zara (St. Mathias)

References

External links
Australian Insects
Australian Faunal Directory

Taractrocerini
Butterflies of Indochina
Butterflies described in 1775